Tjaša Kysselef (born 27 April 1993) is a Slovenian artistic gymnast and a member of the Slovenian national team. Throughout her career, she has primarily competed as a vault specialist, and has been successful on the FIG World Cup circuit. 
She has represented Slovenia at six World Championships: 2009, 2010, 2015, 2017, 2018 and 2019. At the 2018 Mediterranean Games, she helped Slovenia finish sixth in the team final and won the silver medal on vault. At the 2021 European Championships, she qualified to the vault final where she placed fifth.

References

External links

1993 births
Living people
Slovenian female artistic gymnasts
Mediterranean Games medalists in gymnastics
Competitors at the 2018 Mediterranean Games
Sportspeople from Ljubljana
Gymnasts at the 2019 European Games
European Games competitors for Slovenia
Gymnasts at the 2022 Mediterranean Games
21st-century Slovenian women